Fouke  is a city in Miller County, Arkansas, United States. It is part of the Texarkana, Texas - Texarkana, Arkansas Metropolitan Statistical Area. The population was 808 at the 2020 census.  

It received brief widespread attention in the early 1970s due to sightings/claims of a bigfoot-like creature known as the "Fouke Monster", as well as the subsequent fictitious docudrama movie The Legend of Boggy Creek, which played nationwide.

Geography
Fouke is located at  (33.260908, -93.886629) in central Miller County, along U.S. Highway 71. Interstate 49 passes just to the west of the city limits and serves the city with two exits.

History 
The area around Fouke had long been inhabited by the Native American Caddo people, prior to European colonization of the Americas. Caddo tribes and European explorers traded pelts, honey,  beeswax, flour, tobacco, blankets, guns, and other items. After the Louisiana Purchase, the United States established the Sulphur Fork Factory (trading post) where the Sulphur River enters the Red River. In the years following Arkansas statehood, settlers began flowing steadily into the area and the Caddo population was greatly diminished.

In 1889, Seventh Day Baptist minister James Franklin Shaw and his followers were seeking an area to establish a new colony. In 1890, they chose a site along the Texarkana, Shreveport and Natchez Railroad, where a small timber line ended at Fouke's Sawmill. The streets were named for prominent, nationally known Baptists, and upon advertising the area with the offer of reasonably priced land, affordable lumber, and free railroad passage, pioneers traveled to the area from as far away as Idaho, Illinois, and West Virginia.

James H. Fouke, a Presbyterian entrepreneur, lumberman, and railroad executive, helped them establish their colony, and in 1902 he donated land for a school. The city of Fouke was named in his honor.

By the early 1920s, the farming and timber industries had brought people of many faiths to the community. A new Texas and Pacific Railroad depot was constructed in 1906, and the community was incorporated in 1911. Population growth increased during the 1920s oil boom, and in 1928 construction of U.S. Route 71 further increased Fouke's employment opportunities.

During the Prohibition era of 1920–1936, Fouke suffered violent deaths of many men in relation to the illegal trafficking of liquor. Interstate commerce was not well coordinated during that time, which made Fouke's location attractive to those who would commit crimes and then cross the adjoining border(s).

Since the 1920s, Fouke has been a sundown town.

The Fouke State Bank was chartered in 1914, but it went broke during the Great Depression, and job losses in the community caused many to accept work as part of Depression-era programs such as the Civilian Conservation Corps and the Works Progress Administration. It was not until World War II that large numbers of the citizens found employment at the newly established Lone Star Army Ammunition Plant and Red River Army Depot, which were located just west of Texarkana.

Since its incorporation, the city of Fouke has seen many improvements to its infrastructure. Dirt and gravel streets were paved in 1958. A new city hall, jail, and fire station were constructed in 1962. A new "Deep-Well" water system was completed in 1966, and the city's sewer system was completed in 1988.

In 1972, Fouke received national attention when Charles B. Pierce produced a movie called The Legend of Boggy Creek. The movie chronicled the alleged existence of a large, hairy, ape-like creature called the "Fouke Monster". A number of local citizens were cast, and the movie used area wetlands, rivers, and creeks for its location.

In 2001 Fouke celebrated the grand opening of the Fouke Community Center, and the grand opening of the Miller County Historical and Family Museum was celebrated in 2003.

In 2010, Fouke citizens dedicated the Veterans Memorial Park. The memorial covers two-thirds of a city block. It is a perpetually flagged and lighted monument that contains a growing list of veterans' names and military histories.

In 2011, local groups such as the Citizens for a Better Community raised funds to provide improvements that include "Welcome" signs on Highway 71 at the north and south ends of the city, along with various beautification and community service projects. They purchased one of Fouke's historic homes with a plan to renovate and restore it to create an events center and community library. By that time, the Fouke School District had become the city's largest employer, with more than 1,000 students and more than 165 employees.

In 2013, Fouke began the Boggy Creek Festival to promote the local area, bring together the community, and to share information and humor about the "Fouke Monster".

Demographics

2020 census

As of the 2020 United States census, there were 808 people, 281 households, and 204 families residing in the city.

2000 census
As of the census of 2000, there were 700 people, 291 households, and 220 families residing in the city. The population density was 777.8 inhabitants per square mile (299.3/km2). The racial makeup of the city was 95.5% White, 0.3% Black or African American, 2.5% Native American, 0.6% from other races, and 1.2% from two or more races.  1.7% of the population were Hispanic or Latino of any race.

There were 291 households, out of which 47.4% had children under the age of 18 living with them, 57.7% were married couples living together, 13.4% had a female householder with no husband present, and 24.1% were non-families. 21.3% of all households were made up of individuals, and 10.3% had someone living alone who was 65 years of age or older. The average household size was 2.80 and the average family size was 3.26.

In the city, the population was spread out, with 33.8% under the age of 18, 11.8% from 18 to 24, 28.5% from 25 to 44, 16.7% from 45 to 64, and 9.2% who were 65 years of age or older. The median age was 27 years. For every 100 females, there were 95.2 males. For every 100 females age 18 and over, there were 91.8 males.

The median income for a household in the city was $25,192, and the median income for a family was $35,089. Males had a median income of $26,938 versus $20,375 for females. The per capita income for the city was $11,075. About 18.0% of families and 17.5% of the population were below the poverty line, including 17.4% of those under age 18 and 26.7% of those age 65 or over.

Education 
Public education for early childhood, elementary and secondary school students is primarily provided by the Fouke School District, which leads to graduation from Fouke High School.

Media 
Fouke is served by media from Texarkana, and Shreveport.

Infrastructure

Highways
  Interstate 49
  U.S. Route 71

Notable places 
 Allen's Burger Center
 Enochs Berry Farm: "Pick-your-own" blackberries and blueberries
 Historic Scoggins House Community Event Center & Library: Library, genealogy, and local historical research with wedding and event space
 Monster Mart, Home of the Fouke Monster!: Tourist information and general store
 Boggy Creek Cafe

Notable people 
Notable people from the Fouke area include: 
 Bobby Bowen, Christian country singer and songwriter
 George W. Fouke, founder of Gate City Lumber Co., President of Texarkana, Shreveport & Natchez Railroad, and namesake of Fouke, Arkansas
 Henry H. King, a soldier in the Texas Revolution at the Battle of San Jacinto, who afterwards became a member of the Confederate Secret Service
 Pearl Kinman, silent screen movie star
 Harlan Robertson; a rancher and livestock breeder of top bucking bulls for the Professional Rodeo Cowboys Association and the Professional Bull Riders association
 Hardy Alton "Spider" Rowland (1907–1958), a flamboyant newspaperman

See also 
 Stephen King's book, The Stand, mentions Fouke as a city in the same general location, having a nuclear power plant.  No such facility actually exists in Fouke.
 Fouke Monster

References

External links 
 
 Fouke, Arkansas, at the Arkansas Department of Parks, Heritage, and Tourism
 Arkansas Great Southwest, regional information

Images 

Cities in Miller County, Arkansas
Cities in Arkansas
Texarkana metropolitan area